Quentin Serron (born February 25, 1990) is a Belgian basketball player for Limburg United of the BNXT League. Serron plays as point guard or shooting guard.

Professional career
Serron started his professional career in the 2010–11 season, with Telenet Oostende. After his rookie season, he was named the BLB Most Promising Player of the Year.

In June 2016, Serron signed in France with BCM Gravelines. He averaged 8.6 points, 3.6 rebounds and 3.6 assists per game. On July 5, 2018, he signed a two-year deal with Strasbourg IG. In the 2019-20 season, he averaged 4.5 points and 1.4 assists per game.

On February 26, 2020, he has signed with Bilbao Basket of the Liga ACB. Serron averaged 5.7 points and 2.7 rebounds per game in seven games. On July 1, he re-signed with the team to a two-year deal.

On August 26, 2021, he has signed with Boulazac Basket Dordogne of the LNB Pro B.

On September 1, 2022, he has signed with Limburg United of the BNXT League.

International career
He represented Belgium at the EuroBasket 2015 where they lost to Greece in eighth finals with 75–54.

Honours

Club
Telenet Oostende
Belgian League (5): 2011–12, 2012–13, 2013–14, 2014–15, 2015–16
Belgian Cup (4): 2012–13, 2013–14, 2014–15, 2015–16

Individual
BLB Most Promising Player of the Year: 2010–11

References

1990 births
Living people
BC Oostende players
BCM Gravelines players
Belgian expatriate basketball people in France
Belgian expatriate basketball people in Spain
Belgian men's basketball players
Belgium national basketball players
Bilbao Basket players
Boulazac Basket Dordogne players
Liga ACB players
Limburg United players
People from Etterbeek
Point guards
Shooting guards
SIG Basket players
Sportspeople from Brussels